The Sport Australia Hall of Fame was established on 10 December 1985 to recognise the achievements of Australian sportsmen and sportswomen.  The inaugural induction included 120 members with Sir Don Bradman as the first inductee and Dawn Fraser the first female inductee.  In 1989, the Hall of Fame was expanded to include associate members who have assisted in the development of sport in Australia. In 2012, there were 518 members.  Each year the Hall of Fame inducts notable retired athletes, associate members and upgrades one member to 'legend' status.

The main award each year is the 'Don' Award but other awards include Team Sport Australia Award, Spirit of Sport Award and Hall of Fame Moments. 

The National Sports Museum located at the Melbourne Cricket Ground houses the Sport Australia Hall of Fame.

The Don Award

This award was first awarded in 1998. It is named after Sir Donald Bradman and recognises the sporting achievement of the year which has inspired the people of Australia. As of 2022, there are three people who have won the award more than once; Steve Hooker (2008 and 2009), Sally Pearson (2012 and 2014) and Ashleigh Barty (2019 and 2022).

The Dawn Award
This award was first awarded in 2021. It is named after Dawn Fraser and recognises a courageous ground-breaker who has demonstrated achievement against the odds and challenged the status quo

Legends
Each year a member is elevated to 'Legend' status.

See also
 National Sports Museum
 Sport in Australia
 ABC Sports Award of the Year
 Australian Sport Awards
 Australian Institute of Sport Awards
 World Trophy for Australasia
 Sport Australia Hall of Fame inductees

References

External links
Sport Australia Hall of Fame Website

Australian sports trophies and awards
Halls of fame in Australia
Australia
Awards established in 1985
Australia
 
1985 establishments in Australia